Gigantactis paxtoni (common name: Paxton's whipnose) is a species of fish in the whipnose angler (Gigantactinidae) family, first described in 1981 by Erik Bertelsen, Theodore Wells Pietsch III and Robert J. Lavenberg. The species epithet, paxtoni, honours John Paxton of the Australian Museum. 

It differs from other  species in this genus by having filaments on the dorsal surface of the head just behind the base of the illicium (the long filament looking like an angler's line and lure) and by its body shape, and large teeth.

References

Further reading

Stewart, A.L. and Pietsch, T.W. 2015. Family Gigantactinidae. In: Roberts, C., Stewart, A.L. and Struthers, C.D. (eds), The Fishes of New Zealand, pp. 932-936. Te Papa Press.

Gigantactinidae
Fish of the Indian Ocean
Fish of the Pacific Ocean
Deep sea fish
Bioluminescent fish
Fish described in 1981
Taxa named by Theodore Wells Pietsch III
Taxa named by Erik Bertelsen